Lauren Ashley Underwood (born October 4, 1986) is an American politician and registered nurse who is a U.S. representative from Illinois's 14th congressional district as a member of the Democratic Party. Her district, once represented by former House Speaker Dennis Hastert, includes the outer western suburbs of Chicago, including Crystal Lake, Geneva, Oswego, Woodstock, and Yorkville.

After growing up in Naperville, Illinois, Underwood received a degree in nursing from the University of Michigan and two master's degrees from Johns Hopkins University. She started her career as a policy professional in the Obama administration in 2014 and later worked as a senior advisor at the Department of Health and Human Services (HHS).

In 2018, Underwood was elected to the United States House of Representatives, defeating Republican incumbent Randy Hultgren. Upon her swearing in, she became the youngest Black woman to serve in Congress. She was reelected in 2020 by a margin of 1.34%, the ninth-closest House race of the election cycle.

Early life 
Underwood was born on October 4, 1986, in Mayfield Heights, Ohio. At age three, she moved with her family to Naperville, Illinois, where she grew up and attended Neuqua Valley High School, graduating in 2004. She began as a Girl Scout in kindergarten and is a lifetime member. At eight years old, Underwood was diagnosed with supraventricular tachycardia, a pre-existing condition that later shaped her views on health policy.

From 2003 to 2004, she worked on the City of Naperville's Fair Housing Advisory Commission. She earned her Bachelor of Science in Nursing from the University of Michigan in 2008. At Michigan, Underwood took a course on nursing politics that she has said "changed her life" and influenced her to enter healthcare policy. Also at Michigan, she joined the National Pan-Hellenic Council sorority Alpha Kappa Alpha. She received her Master of Science in Nursing and Master of Public Health from Johns Hopkins University in 2009.

Career
In 2014, Underwood became a senior advisor at the United States Department of Health and Human Services (HHS), where she worked to implement the Patient Protection and Affordable Care Act.

Beginning in 2017, Underwood was the Senior Director of Strategy and Regulatory Affairs at Next Level Health. She also served as an adjunct instructor at the Georgetown University School of Nursing & Health Studies.

U.S. House of Representatives

Elections

2018

Her platform focused on improving the Affordable Care Act, expanding job opportunities, infrastructure improvements, and paid family leave. She won the March 20 Democratic primary with 57% of the vote against six opponents.

In the general election, Underwood faced incumbent Republican Randy Hultgren. In a public debate, Underwood, who has a heart condition, said that she had decided to run for the seat because Hultgren voted to repeal the ACA. Hultgren voted in favor of the Republican American Health Care Act, which passed the House in 2017 but not the Senate, and would have repealed and replaced the ACA.

Underwood said the repeal-and-replace bill would have taken away the right of "individuals like me with preexisting conditions to have affordable coverage" and that people like her would either be denied coverage or charged more. Hultgren said the bill would have protected such people because although it would have allowed states to charge people with preexisting conditions more, they would be eligible for subsidies.

Underwood said that health care is "a human right" and that single-payer/universal coverage/Medicare for all was "a great goal" but would have to wait until we have good answers to the questions about costs. Hultgren ran TV ads stating that Underwood supports a single-payer plan.

Former President Barack Obama and Vice President Joe Biden endorsed Underwood. In the November 6 election, she defeated Hultgren with 52.5% of the vote.

2020

Underwood was narrowly reelected over state senator Jim Oberweis, in the ninth-closest race of the House 2020 election cycle. The Associated Press called the election on November 12, nine days after the election.

2022

Underwood ran for reelection in the district for the 2022 elections, and was reelected with 54% of the vote.

Tenure 
According to VoteView, Underwood has the 16th-most liberal voting record in the House of Representatives in the 116th United States Congress.

During the presidency of Donald Trump, Underwood voted in line with Trump's stated position 6.5% of the time. As of November 2022, Underwood had voted in line with Joe Biden's stated position 100% of the time.

In her first term, Underwood wrote four bills that Trump signed into law.

In 2019, Underwood was listed in the Time 100 Next. Her entry was written by U.S. Senator Cory Booker.

On May 22, 2019, Underwood suggested that immigrant deaths in the custody of the United States Border Patrol were intentional.

In the 118th Congress, Underwood was elected co-chair of the House Democratic Policy and Communications Committee, along with Veronica Escobar and Dean Phillips.

Committee assignments
 Committee on Appropriations
 Subcommittee on Agriculture, Rural Development, Food and Drug Administration, and Related Agencies
 Subcommittee on Homeland Security
 Committee on Veterans' Affairs
 Subcommittee on Health
 Subcommittee on Oversight and Investigation

Caucus memberships 

 Congressional Black Caucus
Black Maternal Health Caucus

Electoral history

See also
List of African-American United States representatives
Women in the United States House of Representatives

References

External links

 Congresswoman Lauren Underwood official U.S. House website
 Campaign website

|-

1986 births
21st-century American politicians
African-American members of the United States House of Representatives
African-American people in Illinois politics
African-American women in politics
American women nurses
Democratic Party members of the United States House of Representatives from Illinois
Female members of the United States House of Representatives
Johns Hopkins University alumni
Living people
People from Naperville, Illinois
University of Michigan School of Nursing alumni
Women in Illinois politics
21st-century American women politicians
21st-century African-American women
20th-century African-American people
20th-century African-American women
African-American nurses